The Faculty of International Law, CUPL is a school of the China University of Political Science and Law. The school offers LL.B, LL.M and Ph.D degrees in Chinese and English. CUPL Faculty of International Law has over 49 faculty members and this makes it the largest faculty in Chinese universities that specializes in international law.

References

External links 
LLM & PhD Programs

China University of Political Science and Law
Law schools in China